Bosobolo is a small town in Nord-Ubangi Province of northern Democratic Republic of the Congo. As of 2009 it had an estimated population of 16,397.
It is the administrative center of Bosobolo territory.

References

Populated places in Nord-Ubangi